Yellow Leaf Hammocks is an American hammock company. The company's business model benefits the Mlabri people of Northern Thailand through the sale of their hammocks. It was established in August 2011.

On May 15, 2020, co-founders Joe Demin and Rachel Connors pitched Yellow Leaf Hammocks on Shark Tank. Guest shark and Kind Snacks CEO Daniel Lubetzky invested US$1 million for a 25% stake in the company.

References

2011 establishments in California
Social enterprises
Economy of Thailand